Aymara (also ) is an Aymaran language spoken by the Aymara people of the Bolivian Andes. It is one of only a handful of Native American languages with over one million speakers. Aymara, along with Spanish and Quechua, is an official language in Bolivia and Peru. It is also spoken, to a much lesser extent, by some communities in northern Chile, where it is a recognized minority language.

Some linguists have claimed that Aymara is related to its more widely spoken neighbor, Quechua. That claim, however, is disputed. Although there are indeed similarities, like the nearly identical phonologies, the majority position among linguists today is that the similarities are better explained as areal features rising from prolonged cohabitation, rather than natural genealogical changes that would stem from a common protolanguage.

Aymara is an agglutinating and, to a certain extent, a polysynthetic language. It has a subject–object–verb word order. It is based on a three value logic system. Aymara is normally written using the Latin alphabet, but in 2015 a full writing system was developed using the Korean script Hangeul.

Etymology 
The ethnonym "Aymara" may be ultimately derived from the name of some group occupying the southern part of what is now the Quechua speaking area of Apurímac. Regardless, the use of the word "Aymara" as a label for this people was standard practice as early as 1567, as evident from Garci Diez de San Miguel's report of his inspection of the province of Chucuito (1567, 14; cited in Lafaye 1964). In this document, he uses the term aymaraes to refer to the people. The language was then called Colla. It is believed that Colla was the name of an Aymara nation at the time of conquest, and later was the southernmost region of the Inca empire Collasuyu. However, Cerrón Palomino disputes this claim and asserts that Colla were in fact Puquina speakers who were the rulers of Tiwanaku in the first and third centuries (2008:246). This hypothesis suggests that the linguistically-diverse area ruled by the Puquina came to adopt Aymara languages in their southern region.

In any case, the use of "Aymara" to refer to the language may have first occurred in the works of the lawyer, magistrate and tax collector in Potosí and Cusco, Polo de Ondegardo. This man, who later assisted Viceroy Toledo in creating a system under which the indigenous population would be ruled for the next 200 years, wrote a report in 1559 entitled 'On the lineage of the Yncas and how they extended their conquests' in which he discusses land and taxation issues of the Aymara under the Inca empire.

More than a century passed before "Aymara" entered general usage to refer to the language spoken by the Aymara people (Briggs, 1976:14). In the meantime the Aymara language was referred to as "the language of the Colla". The best account of the history of Aymara is that of Cerrón-Palomino, who shows that the ethnonym Aymara, which came from the glottonym, is likely derived from the Quechuaized toponym ayma-ra-y 'place of communal property'. The entire history of this term is thoroughly outlined in his book, Voces del Ande (2008:19–32) and Lingüística Aimara.

The suggestion that "Aymara" comes from the Aymara words "jaya" (ancient) and "mara" (year, time) is almost certainly a mistaken folk etymology.

Classification 
It is often assumed that the Aymara language descends from the language spoken in Tiwanaku on the grounds that it is the native language of that area today. That is very far from certain, however, and most specialists now incline to the idea that Aymara did not expand into the Tiwanaku area until rather recently, as it spread southwards from an original homeland that was more likely to have been in Central Peru. Aymara placenames are found all the way north into central Peru. Indeed, (Altiplano) Aymara is actually the one of two extant members of a wider language family, the other surviving representative being Jaqaru.

The family was established by the research of Lucy Briggs (a fluent speaker) and Dr. Martha Hardman de Bautista of the Program in Linguistics at the University of Florida. Jaqaru [jaqi aru = human language] and Kawki communities are in the district of Tupe, Yauyos Valley, in the Dept. of Lima, in central Peru. Terminology for this wider language family is not yet well established. Hardman has proposed the name 'Jaqi' ('human') while other widely respected Peruvian linguists have proposed alternative names for the same language family. Alfredo Torero uses the term 'Aru' ('speech'); Rodolfo Cerrón-Palomino, meanwhile, has proposed that the term 'Aymara' should be used for the whole family, distinguished into two branches, Southern (or Altiplano) Aymara and Central Aymara (Jaqaru and Kawki). Each of these three proposals has its followers in Andean linguistics. In English usage, some linguists use the term Aymaran languages for the family and reserve 'Aymara' for the Altiplano branch.

Dialects 
There is some degree of regional variation within Aymara, but all dialects are mutually intelligible.

Most studies of the language focused on either the Aymara spoken on the southern Peruvian shore of Lake Titicaca or the Aymara spoken around La Paz. Lucy Therina Briggs classifies both regions as being part of the Northern Aymara dialect, which encompasses the department of La Paz in Bolivia and the department of Puno in Peru. The Southern Aymara dialect is spoken in the eastern half of the Iquique province in northern Chile and in most of the Bolivian department of Oruro. It is also found in northern Potosi and southwest Cochabamba but is slowly being replaced by Quechua in those regions.

Intermediate Aymara shares dialectical features with both Northern and Southern Aymara and is found in the eastern half of the Tacna and Moquegua departments in southern Peru and in the northeastern tip of Chile.

Geographical distribution 

There are roughly two million Bolivian speakers, half a million Peruvian speakers, and perhaps a few thousand speakers in Chile. At the time of the Spanish conquest in the sixteenth century, Aymara was the dominant language over a much larger area than today, including most of highland Peru south of Cusco. Over the centuries, Aymara has gradually lost speakers both to Spanish and to Quechua; many Peruvian and Bolivian communities that were once Aymara-speaking now speak Quechua.

Phonology

Vowels 
Aymara has three phonemic vowel qualities , which, in most varieties of the language, occur as either long or short (i.e. /iː i aː a uː u/). Long vowels are indicated in the spelling with a diaeresis in writing: ä, ï, ü. The high vowels /i u/ occur as mid-high /e o/ when near uvular consonants /q qʰ qʼ χ/.

Vowel deletion is frequent in Aymara. Vowel deletion typically occurs due to one of three factors: (i) phonotactic, (ii) syntactic, and (iii) morphophonemic.

 Phonotactic vowel deletion takes the shape of hiatus reduction when two vowels co-occur through word construction or through suffixation. In such environments, one vowel deletes. (iii) If the sequence is composed of two identical vowels, one will delete.
 Vowel elision can be syntactically conditioned. For example, in nominal compounds and noun phrases, all adjectival/nominal modifiers with three or more vowels in a modifier + nucleus NP lose their final vowel.
 Morphemic vowel deletion is the most common. Some suffixes never co-occur with the preceding vowel in the root, whereas others lose their own vowel in certain environments. Patterns of morphophonological vowel deletion derive from historical changes that affected individual suffixes differently, so that no clear patterns emerge.

Consonants 
Aymara has phonemic stops at the labial, alveolar, palatal, velar and uvular points of articulation. Sounds such as [] occur as allophones of //. Aymara also has a tapped , and an alveolar/palatal contrast for nasals and laterals, as well as two semivowels ( and ).

Orthographic representation is the same as the IPA where not shown.

Stress 
Stress is usually on the second-to-last syllable, but long vowels may shift it. Although the final vowel of a word is elided except at the end of a phrase, the stress remains unchanged.

Syllable structure 
The vast majority of roots are disyllabic and, with few exceptions, suffixes are monosyllabic. Roots conform to the template (C)V(C)CV, with CVCV being predominant. The majority of suffixes are CV, though there are some exceptions: CVCV, CCV, CCVCV and even VCV are possible but rare.

The agglutinative nature of this predominantly suffixing language, coupled with morphophonological alternations caused by vowel deletion and phonologically conditioned constraints, gives rise to interesting surface structures that operate in the domain of the morpheme, syllable, and phonological word/phrase. The phonological/morphophonological processes observed include syllabic reduction, epenthesis, deletion, and reduplication.

Orthography 

Beginning with Spanish missionary efforts, there have been many attempts to create a writing system for Aymara. The colonial sources employed a variety of writing systems heavily influenced by Spanish, the most widespread one being that of Bertonio. Many of the early grammars employed unique alphabets as well as the one of Middendorf's Aymara-Sprache (1891).

The first official alphabet to be adopted for Aymara was the Scientific Alphabet. It was approved by the III Congreso Indigenista Interamericano de la Paz in 1954, though its origins can be traced as far back as 1931. Rs. No 1593 (Deza Galindo 1989, 17). It was the first official record of an alphabet, but in 1914, Sisko Chukiwanka Ayulo and Julián Palacios Ríos had recorded what may be the first of many attempts to have one alphabet for both Quechua and Aymara, the Syentifiko Qheshwa-Aymara Alfabeto with 37 graphemes.

Several other attempts followed, with varying degrees of success. Some orthographic attempts even expand further: the Alfabeto Funcional Trilingüe, made up of 40 letters (including the voiced stops necessary for Spanish) and created by the Academia de las Lenguas Aymara y Quechua in Puno in 1944 is the one used by the lexicographer Juan Francisco Deza Galindo in his Diccionario Aymara – Castellano / Castellano – Aymara. This alphabet has five vowels ⟨a, e, i, o, u⟩, aspiration is conveyed with an ⟨h⟩ next to the consonant, and ejectives with ⟨'⟩. The most unusual characteristic is the expression of the uvular /χ/ with ⟨jh⟩. The other uvular segment, /q/, is expressed by ⟨q⟩, but transcription rules mandate that the following vowel must be ⟨a, e, o⟩ (not ⟨i, u⟩), presumably to account for uvular lowering and to facilitate multilingual orthography.

The alphabet created by the Comisión de Alfabetización y Literatura Aymara (CALA) was officially recognized in Bolivia in 1968 (co-existing with the 1954 Scientific Alphabet). Besides being the alphabet employed by Protestant missionaries, it is also the one used for the translation of the Book of Mormon. Also in 1968, de Dios Yapita created his take on the Aymara alphabet at the Instituto de Lenga y Cultura Aymara (ILCA).

Nearly 15 years later, the Servicio Nacional de Alfabetización y Educación Popular (SENALEP) attempted to consolidate these alphabets to create a system which could be used to write both Aymara and Quechua, creating what was known as the Alfabeto Unificado. The alphabet, later sanctioned in Bolivia by Decree 20227 on 9 May 1984 and in Peru as la Resolución Ministerial Peruana 1218ED on 18 November 1985, consists of 3 vowels, 26 consonants and an umlaut to mark vowel length. 
In this standard orthography, the consonants are represented as shown below.

Morphology 
Aymara is a highly agglutinative, predominantly suffixing language. All suffixes can be categorized into the nominal, verbal, transpositional and those not subcategorized for lexical category (including stem-external word-level suffixes and phrase-final suffixes), as below:

 Nominal and verbal morphology is characterized by derivational- and inflectional-like suffixes as well as non-productive suffixes.
 Transpositional morphology consists of verbalizers (that operate on the root or phrasal levels) and nominalizers (including an action nominalizer, an agentive, and a resultative).
 Suffixes not subcategorized for lexical category can be divided into three stem-external, word-level suffixes (otherwise known as "independent suffixes") and around a dozen phrase-final suffixes (otherwise known as "sentence suffixes").

Nominal suffixes 
 Non-productive nominal suffixes vary considerably by variant but typically include those below. Some varieties additionally also have (1) the suffix -wurasa (< Spanish 'horas'), which expresses 'when' on aka 'this', uka 'that' and kuna 'what'; (2) temporal suffixes -unt ~ -umt; and (3) -kucha, which attaches to only two roots, jani 'no' and jicha 'now':
 kinship suffixes, including -la, -lla, -chi, and/or -ta
 the expression of size with -ch'a
 the suffix -sa 'side', which attaches to only the demonstratives and kawki 'where'
 Nominal derivational-like suffixes:
 diminutive suffixes
 delimitative suffix -chapi
 Nominal inflectional-like suffixes:
 Attributive suffix -ni
 Possessive paradigm
 Plural -naka
 Reciprocal/inclusor -pacha
 Case suffixes – Syntactic relations are generally case-marked, with the exception of the unmarked subject. Case is affixed to the last element of a noun phrase, usually corresponding to the head. Most varieties of Aymara have 14 cases (though in many, the genitive and locative have merged into a single form): ablative -ta, accusative (indicated by vowel suppression), allative -ru, benefactive -taki, comparative -jama, genitive -na, instrumental/comitative -mpi, interactive -pura, locative -na, limitative -kama, nominative (zero), perlative -kata, purposive -layku.

Verbal suffixes 
All verbs require at least one suffix to be grammatical.

 Verbal derivational-like suffixes
 Direction of motion — Although these suffixes are quite productive, they are not obligatory. The meaning of a word which is affixed with a member of this category is often but not always predictable, and the word formed may have a different meaning than the root.
 Spatial location — The nine spatial locations suffixes are likewise highly productive and not obligatory. Similarly, the meaning of the word that contains a member of this category is typically (but not consistently) predictable. There are also contexts in which the word formed has a meaning that significantly differs from that of the root to which it attaches.
 Valency-increasing — The five valency increasing suffixes may occur on a wide range of verbs but are not obligatory. The meaning expressed when a word receives one of these suffixes is predictable.
 Multipliers/reversers — The two multipliers/reversers are comparatively less productive and are not obligatory. In some contexts, attachment to a verb conveys a reverser meaning and effectively express the opposite of the meaning of the plain root. In this respect, the multipliers/reversers are the most derivational-like of all the suffixes discussed so far.
 Aspect — This category is complicated insofar as it is made up of a diverse array of suffix types, some of which are more productive and/or obligatory than others.
 Others — In some varieties of Aymara, there are three suffixes not classified into the categories above: the verbal comparative -jama, the category buffer -(w)jwa, and the intensifier -paya. Semantically, these three suffixes do not have much in common. They also vary with respect to the degree which they may be classified as more derivational-like or more inflectional-like.
 Verbal inflectional-like suffixes:
 Person/tense — Person and tense are fused into a unitary suffix. These forms are among the most inflectional-like of the verbal suffixes insofar as they are all obligatory and productive. The so-called personal-knowledge tenses include the simple (non-past) and the proximal past. The non-personal knowledge tenses includes the future and distal past.
 Number — The plural verbal suffix, -pha (just as the nominal one,-naka) is optional. Thus, while pluralization is very productive, it is not obligatory.
 Mood and modality — Mood and modality includes mood, evidentials, event modality, and the imperative. These suffixes are both productive and obligatory. Their semantic affect is usually transparent.

Transpositional suffixes 

A given word can take several transpositional suffixes:
 Verbalizers: There are six suffixes whose primary function is to verbalize nominal roots (not including the reflexive -si and the propagative -tata). These forms can be subdivided into two groups, (1) phrase verbalizers and (2) root verbalizers.
 Nominalizers: There are three suffixes are used to derive nouns: the agentive -iri, the resultative -ta, and the action nominalizer (sometimes glossed as the "infinitive" in some descriptions) -ña.

Suffixes not subcategorized for lexical categories 

There are two kinds of suffixes not subcategorized for lexical categories:
 Stem external word-final suffixes (sometimes known as "independent suffixes") — There are three suffixes that are not classifiable as members of either nominal or verbal morphology and are not phrase-final suffixes: the emphatic -puni, the delimitative -ki, and the additive -raki
 Phrase-final suffixes (sometimes known as "sentence suffixes" in the literature) — Most Aymara phrases have at least one of the eleven (depending on variant) possible phrase-final suffixes to be grammatical. The phrase-final suffix must appear minimally on a noun, noun phrase, verb, or verb phrase (note that two phrase-final suffixes, the additive -sa and the confirmatory -pi appear exclusively on nouns but otherwise pattern with phrase-final suffixes and so may not be best treated with nominal morphology). Exceptions to the requirement that a phrase has at least one phrase-final suffix are mainly limited to imperative constructions.

Idiosyncrasies 

Linguistic and gestural analysis by Núñez and Sweetser also asserts that the Aymara have an apparently unique (or at least very rare) understanding of time. Aymara is, with Quechua, one of very few [Núñez & Sweetser, 2006, p. 403] languages in which speakers seem to represent the past as in front of them and the future as behind them. Their argument is mainly within the framework of conceptual metaphor, which recognizes in general two subtypes of the metaphor "the passage of time is motion:" one is "time passing is motion over a landscape" (or "moving-ego"), and the other is "time passing is a moving object" ("moving-events"). The latter metaphor does not explicitly involve the individual/speaker. Events are in a queue, with prior events towards the front of the line. The individual may be facing the queue, or it may be moving from left to right in front of him/her.

The claims regarding Aymara involve the moving-ego metaphor. Most languages conceptualize the ego as moving forward into the future, with ego's back to the past. The English sentences prepare for what lies before us and we are facing a prosperous future exemplify the metaphor. In contrast, Aymara seems to encode the past as in front of individuals and the future behind them. That is typologically a rare phenomenon [Núñez & Sweetser, 2006, p. 416].

The fact that English has words like before and after that are (currently or archaically) polysemous between 'front/earlier' or 'back/later' may seem to refute the claims regarding Aymara uniqueness. However, those words relate events to other events and are part of the moving-events metaphor. In fact, when before means in front of ego, it can mean only future. For instance, our future is laid out before us while our past is behind us. Parallel Aymara examples describe future days as qhipa uru, literally 'back days', and they are sometimes accompanied by gestures to behind the speaker. The same applies to Quechua-speakers, whose expression qhipa p'unchaw corresponds directly to Aymara qhipa uru. Possibly, the metaphor is from the fact that the past is visible (in front of one's eyes), but the future is not.

Pedagogy 
There is increasing use of Aymara locally and there are increased numbers learning the language, both Bolivian and abroad. In Bolivia and Peru, intercultural bilingual education programs with Aymara and Spanish have been introduced in the last two decades. There are even projects to offer Aymara through the internet, such as by ILCA.

Sample 

The following is a sample text in Ayamara, Article 1 of the Universal Declaration of Human Rights (by the United Nations):

 1 AMTA – Taqi jaqinakaxa qhispiyata yuripxi ukhamaraki jerarquía ukhamaraki derechos ukanakana kikipa. Jupanakax amuyt’añampi ukat concienciampi phuqt’atapxiwa ukat maynit maynikamaw jilat kullakanakjam sarnaqapxañapa.
 /ˈtaqi haqinaˈkaχa qʰispiˈjata juˈɾipχi ukʰamaˈɾaki hiɾaɾˈkia ukʰamaˈɾaki diˈɾitʃus ukanaˈkana kiˈkipa  hupaˈnakaχ amujtʼaˈɲampi ˈukat kunsiinsiˈampi pʰuqtʼatapˈχiwa ˈukat ˈmajnit majnˈkamaw ˈhilat kuʎakaˈnakham saɾnaqapχaˈɲapa /

Translation:

 Article 1 – All human beings are born free and equal in ranking and rights. They are endowed with reason and conscience and should act towards one another in a spirit of brotherhood.

See also 
 Jaqaru language
 Indigenous languages of the Americas
 Languages of Peru
 List of Spanish words of Indigenous American Indian origin

Notes

References

Sources 
 Coler, Matt. A Grammar of Muylaq' Aymara: Aymara as spoken in Southern Peru . Brill: Leiden, 2014.

Further reading 

 Coler, Matt. A Grammar of Muylaq' Aymara: Aymara as spoken in Southern Peru . Brill: Leiden, 2014. 
 
 
 Gifford, Douglas. Time Metaphors in Aymara and Quechua. St. Andrews: University of St. Andrews, 1986.
 Guzmán de Rojas, Iván. Logical and Linguistic Problems of Social Communication with the Aymara People. Manuscript report / International Development Research Centre, 66e. [Ottawa]: International Development Research Centre, 1985.
 Hardman, Martha James. The Aymara Language in Its Social and Cultural Context: A Collection Essays on Aspects of Aymara Language and Culture. Gainesville: University Presses of Florida, 1981. 
 Hardman, Martha James, Juana Vásquez, and Juan de Dios Yapita. Aymara Grammatical Sketch: To Be Used with Aymar Ar Yatiqañataki. Gainesville, Fla: Aymara Language Materials Project, Dept. of Anthropology, University of Florida, 1971.
 Hardman, Martha James. Primary research materials online as full-text in the University of Florida's Digital Collections, on Dr. Hardman's website, and learning Aymara resources by Dr. Hardman.

External links 

 Aymara on The Internet  A course for Aymara available in English and Spanish.
 Aymara Swadesh vocabulary lists (from Wiktionary's Swadesh-list appendix)
 https://web.archive.org/web/20110720153212/http://clas.uchicago.edu/language_teaching/aymara.shtml
 www.aymara.org An extensive website about the language in English, Spanish and Aymara.
 The Sounds of the Andean Languages listen online to pronunciations of Aymara words, see photos of speakers and their home regions, learn about the origins and varieties of Aymara.
 Bolivians equip ancient language for digital times
 Encyclopedy in Aymara
 Aymara – English Dictionary: from Webster's Online Dictionary – The Rosetta Edition.
 Beginning Aymara – a course book in pdf form
 Aymara (Intercontinental Dictionary Series)

Spanish 
 Aymara – Compendio de Estrutura Fonológica y Gramatical, 20 downloadable PDF files

 
Indigenous languages of the Andes
Languages of Bolivia
Languages of Chile
Languages of Peru
Aymara
Subject–object–verb languages